Renaissance is a political party in Italy.

Its leader is Vittorio Sgarbi, an Italian art critic, art historian, politician, cultural commentator and television personality. Sgarbi was formerly a member of the Italian Liberal Party, which was elected in Parliament in 1992, and after its dissolution in 1994 joined in Forza Italia, continuing to be MP until 2006.

The party's aim is to increase the investments in culture, which is considered the main resource for Italy.

On 19 January 2018 Vittorio Sgarbi joined Forza Italia. However, the party (in a joint list with Moderates in Revolution) ran its candidates in the 2018 Italian general election in the constituency of Friuli-Venezia Giulia, gaining a few hundred votes (less than 0.1% for both the Chamber of Deputies and the Senate).

On 23 March 2022 the party merged with the anti-lockdown association of entrepreneurs led by Umberto Carriera and changed its name to I Open Renaissance (Io Apro Rinascimento).

References

2017 establishments in Italy
Liberal parties in Italy
Political parties established in 2017